"Get It Up" is the debut single by the Time, from their 1981 self-titled debut album. Like most of the album, the song was recorded in Prince's home studio in April 1981, and was produced, arranged, composed and performed by Prince with Morris Day later adding his lead vocals. Revolution keyboardist Doctor Fink provided synth solos on the track, uncredited.

The funk-pop number relies on synthesizers and contains numerous solos throughout the song. The song is propelled by a strong bass line and contains live drums and handclaps. A raunchy guitar solo provides a rock element to the funky track. "Get It Up" is basically an ode to sex and Day's attempts to get some. Prince's vocals are very apparent in the song, both in the background and the lead at times.

"Get It Up" was only released as a 7" single with the poppy "After Hi School" as its B-side. "After Hi School", while not an outstanding effort was composed by Dez Dickerson and is perhaps the strongest pop effort on the album. Along with the track "Cool", "Get It Up" peaked at number 6 on the Billboard Hot R&B singles chart, and at number 16 on the Disco Top 80 chart. The full version of "Get It Up" was later a B-side for the 12" single of "Ice Cream Castles" in 1984. "Get It Up" is one of The Time's more popular numbers, and a live version of the song recorded at the House of Blues in 1998 was included on Morris Day's 2004 album, It's About Time where it segues into "777-9311".

TLC version

"Get It Up" was covered by girl group TLC for the Poetic Justice soundtrack becoming a major hit for the group and was later included in TLC's greatest hits album, Now and Forever: The Hits. The video for TLC's "Get It Up" was shot in June 1993.

Charts

Weekly charts

Year-end charts

References

1981 debut singles
1993 singles
The Time (band) songs
Songs written by Prince (musician)
TLC (group) songs
Song recordings produced by Tim & Bob
Song recordings produced by Dallas Austin
Song recordings produced by Prince (musician)
1981 songs
Warner Records singles